The R121 road is a regional road in south County Dublin and Fingal, Ireland.

The official description of the R121 from the Roads Act 1993 (Classification of Regional Roads) Order 2012  reads:

R121: Lucan - Blanchardstown - Skephubble, County Dublin

Between its junction with R835 at Leixlip Road in the town of Lucan in the county of South Dublin and its junction with R122 at Skephubble in the county of Fingal via Main Street (and via Dispensary Lane) in the town of Lucan; and Lucan Bridge in the county of South Dublin: Laraghcon, Westmanstown, Barberstown Cross, Woodwall Road, Luttrellstown Cross, Clonsilla Road, Blanchardstown Road South, Blanchardstown Road North, Cruisrath Road, Tyrrelstown Road, Hollywoodrath, Ward Lower and Newpark all in the county of Fingal.

See also
Roads in Ireland
National primary road
National secondary road
Regional road

References

Regional roads in the Republic of Ireland
Roads in Fingal